Vanguard Personality of the Year Awards is an annual award organized by Vanguard (Newspapers) to honour distinguished Nigerians who have excelled in their chosen careers. The event premiered between 2007 and 2008 as the Bankers' award. It was on hold for four years until 2012, when it was re-introduced and rebranded as Vanguard Personality of the Year Awards. In 2022, the event celebrated its 10th edition in Lagos, Nigeria. Past recipients of the award include; Babajide Sanwo-Olu, Adegboyega Oyetola, Godwin Obaseki, Abdullahi Sule, Rotimi Akeredolu, and Afe Babalola.

Notable awardees

References 

Annual events in Lagos
Literary awards by magazines and newspapers